Bay Stars was a semi-professional South African football (soccer) club based in the city of Port Elizabeth that played in the SAFA Second Division.

The club was set up in 2011, after purchasing the SAFA Second Division franchise of Bay Academy. Bay Academy's parent club, Bay United, had been sold and moved to Polokwane, leaving Port Elizabeth without a professional football club. The club spent both years of its existence in the third tier of South African football. During the 2011–12 season, the league was known as the Vodacom League, during the 2012–13 season, it was known as the SAFA Second Division.

Following the 2012–13 season, the club's Second Division franchise was sold, and became Morning Stars. The SAFA Regional League franchise was sold later in the off season, and became Motherwell Academy.

Ownership
Bay Stars was owned by local businessmen Yusuf Adams and Tony Lovegrove, in partnership with the Nelson Mandela Bay Metropolitan Municipality. In 2013, the club's SAFA second division franchise was sold to the municipality's deputy mayor, Chippa Ngcolomba, whobegan the process changing the club's name to Morning Stars.

Tony Lovegrove ran the club as its managing director, while Nelson Mandela Metropolitan University ran the club's academy team.

Home stadium
The senior team played its SAFA Second Division matches at the Gelvandale Stadium. The academy team played its SAFA Regional League matches at the Missionvale Campus of Nelson Mandela Metropolitan University.

Honours
Vodacom League: 3rd (Eastern Cape stream)
2011–12

SAFA Second Division: 2nd (Eastern Cape stream)
2012–13

SAFA Regional League: 2nd (Nelson Mandela Bay stream)
2012–13 –

Club records

Senior team
SAFA Second Division: 
2011–12 – 3rd (Eastern Cape stream)
2012–13 – 2nd (Eastern Cape stream)

Nedbank Cup: 
2012 – Vodacom League Qualification Play-offs
2013 – SAFA Second Division Qualification Play-offs

Academy team
SAFA Regional League: 
2012–13 – 2nd (Nelson Manedla Bay stream)

Former coaches
 Graham Harrison: 2011 – 2012
 Mark Harrison: 2012 – 2013
 Mark Tommy: 2013
 Urban de Kock: 2013 –

Caretaker coach

Former captains
 Niven Kops 2011-2012,Romano Scott 2012-2013

Player of the year
 Leroy van Rensburg 2011–12

References

External links
Bay Stars official website
Official Facebook page

Association football clubs established in 2011
Former SAFA Second Division clubs
Soccer clubs in Port Elizabeth
2011 establishments in South Africa
2013 disestablishments in South Africa
Phoenix clubs (association football)